Gerdak-e Sepian (also Romanized as Gerdak-e Sepīān; also known as Gerd Taspīān) is a village in Lahijan-e Sharqi Rural District, Lajan District, Piranshahr County, West Azerbaijan Province, Iran. At the 2006 census, its population was 640, in 100 families.

References 

Populated places in Piranshahr County